This is a list of Indian dubbing artists that have Wikipedia articles and are credited for giving voice to certain roles in foreign media. It can also be for Indian media as well, but spoken in a different language, or for those that are unable to convey their roles in the same language.

A

B

C

D

G

J

K

L

M

N

P

R

S

T

U

V

References

 
Dubbing artists
India